For the basketball player with a similar name, see Teófilo Cruz

Carlos Teo Rosario Cruz (November 4, 1937 – February 15, 1970) was a boxer from the Dominican Republic. Cruz was world lightweight champion from 1968 to 1969. He is the older brother of former super bantamweight world champion of boxing, Leo Cruz.

Amateur career
Cruz claimed he didn't put on his first pair of boxing gloves until his 20th birthday.  He fought as an amateur from 1957 to 1959, posting a 14–3 record.

Personal
Cruz's father, Francisco Rosario Almonte was an army officer in the Dominican military.  Cruz met his wife, Mildred Ortiz in the town of Río Piedras in Puerto Rico. They were married in 1961 when Ortiz was 24 years old.  Cruz had two children.

Cruz's younger brother, Leo Cruz, went on to become a world champion.

Pro career
He started his career as a professional boxer with a loss, being defeated by decision in eight rounds by Juan José Jiménez, October 23 of 1959 in Santo Domingo. His first win came on December 3 of that year, also in Santo Domingo, with a ten-round decision win over Rafael Acevedo.

After one more win in Santo Domingo, he moved to San Juan, Puerto Rico. There, he posted a record of 7 wins and 2 losses before returning to Santo Domingo in 1962. Out of the 7 wins in Puerto Rico during that era, 5 were by knockout. In his return to Santo Domingo, he posted a decision win over Acevedo in a rematch. Towards the end of 1962, he started campaigning in the United States, particularly in New York. There, he boxed 5 times before returning to San Juan for another bout. He won 4 and drew 1 of those fights, all wins by decision.

He spent the first half of 1964 touring Australia, where he won 2 fights and lost one. He lost on points to Graham Dicker in Brisbane, stopped Guizani Rezgui in Sydney and outpointed Gilberto Biondi in Melbourne. Then he returned to Latin America, his first fight after arriving from Australia being a major step up in quality of opposition for him: In Caracas, he met fellow world champion boxer Carlos Morocho Hernández. He was knocked out in four rounds by Hernandez. On to Panama City, where he lost a ten-round decision to Julio Ruiz. He finished his year by beating Marcos Morales, a boxer of Puerto Rico during this era, at Santo Domingo.

In 1965, he was undefeated. He fought in St. Croix, in Mayagüez, in Caguas and in London among other places. He won all ten of his bouts that year.

He won 8 bouts, lost 1 and drew 1 in 1966. He drew with Jaime Valladares in Quito, and lost to Frankie Narvaez in San Juan. But he also beat former world title challenger Bunny Grant. In 1967, he avenged his loss to Narvaez, and went undefeated the rest of the year, securing his position as the world's number one challenger among Lightweights.

He won three more fights to begin 1968, and then, on June 29 in Santo Domingo, he was given his first chance to challenge for a world title. He became world Lightweight champion when he defeated Carlos Ortiz by a decision in fifteen rounds.

He defended the world title with a fifteen-round decision over Mando Ramos in Los Angeles, and then, he closed the year by winning a non-title bout in Tokyo, also by decision, in ten.

There was a rematch between Cruz and Ramos, also held in Los Angeles. The second time around, Ramos became world Lightweight champion by beating Cruz with an eleventh-round knockout. Cruz went on to win his next three bouts of 1969.

On January 17 of 1970, Cruz won his last fight. He beat Benito Juarez in San Juan by a decision in ten, and then returned to Santo Domingo.

Professional boxing record

Death
On February 15, he was flying back to San Juan alongside his family for a fight against Roger Zami, when their Dominicana de Aviación DC-9 plane crashed into the waters of the Caribbean shortly after take-off, killing Cruz, his wife and two children, and the rest of the passengers, among which also were a large part of Puerto Rico's national women's volleyball team .

See also
List of world lightweight boxing champions

References

External links

|-

|-

1937 births
1970 deaths
Dominican Republic male boxers
People from Santiago de los Caballeros
World lightweight boxing champions
World Boxing Association champions
World Boxing Council champions
The Ring (magazine) champions
Victims of aviation accidents or incidents in 1970
Victims of aviation accidents or incidents in the Dominican Republic